Ilona Uhlíková-Voštová (born 9 April 1954 in Stod) is a female former international table tennis player from Czechoslovakia.

Table tennis career
From 1968 to 1980 she won several medals in singles, doubles, and team events in the Table Tennis European Championships and in the World Table Tennis Championships

She won a bronze medal at the 1969 World Table Tennis Championships in the women's doubles with Jitka Karlíková and two years later won a second bronze at the 1971 World Table Tennis Championships in the women's singles.

She also won five English Open titles.

See also
 List of table tennis players
 List of World Table Tennis Championships medalists

References

 Profile of Ilona Uhlíková-Voštová

1954 births
Living people
Czech female table tennis players
Czechoslovak table tennis players
People from Stod
Sportspeople from the Plzeň Region